Maksim Viktorovich Fyodorov (born 20 January 1986) is a former Russian professional football player.

Club career
He spent the first five seasons of his senior career in the FC Dynamo Kyiv system, but did not make any appearances for the first squad.

He played 3 seasons in the Russian Football National League for 4 different teams.

External links
 
 

1986 births
People from Chekhovsky District
Living people
Russian footballers
Association football forwards
FC Dynamo-3 Kyiv players
FC Dynamo-2 Kyiv players
FC CSKA Kyiv players
FC Mika players
FC Luch Vladivostok players
FC Torpedo Moscow players
FC Petrotrest players
FC Dynamo Saint Petersburg players
Ukrainian First League players
Armenian Premier League players
Russian expatriate footballers
Expatriate footballers in Ukraine
Expatriate footballers in Armenia
Sportspeople from Moscow Oblast